Carlos Hora (born 1 September 1945) is a Peruvian sports shooter. He competed at the 1980 Summer Olympics, the 1984 Summer Olympics and the 1988 Summer Olympics.

References

1945 births
Living people
Peruvian male sport shooters
Olympic shooters of Peru
Shooters at the 1980 Summer Olympics
Shooters at the 1984 Summer Olympics
Shooters at the 1988 Summer Olympics
Place of birth missing (living people)
Pan American Games medalists in shooting
Pan American Games gold medalists for Peru
Pan American Games silver medalists for Peru
Shooters at the 1983 Pan American Games
Shooters at the 1987 Pan American Games
Medalists at the 1983 Pan American Games
Medalists at the 1987 Pan American Games
20th-century Peruvian people
21st-century Peruvian people